A list of presidents of St John's College, Oxford:

 Rev. Alexander Belsyre (1557–1559)
 Rev. William Eley (1559–1560)
 Rev. William Stock (1560–1564)
 Rev. John Robinson (1564–1572)
 Rev. Tobias Matthew (1572–1577)
 Rev. Francis Willis (1577–1590)
 Rev. Ralph Hutchinson (1590–1606)
 Rev. John Buckeridge, 1606–1611
 Rev. William Laud, 1611–1621
 Rev. William Juxon, 1621–1633
 Rev. Richard Baylie, 1633–1648
 Rev. Francis Cheynell, 1648–1650
 Rev. Thankful Owen, 1650–1660
 Rev. Richard Baylie, 1660–1667
 Rev. Peter Mews, 1667–1673
 Rev. William Levinz, 1673–1698
 Rev. William Delaune, 1698–1728
 Rev. William Holmes, 1728–1748
 Rev. William Derham, 1748–1757
 Rev. William Walker, 1757
 Rev. Thomas Fry, 1757–1772
 Rev. Samuel Dennis, 1772–1795
 Rev. Michael Marlow, 1795–1828
 Rev. Philip Wynter, 1828–1871
 Rev. James Bellamy, 1871–1909
 Rev. Herbert Armitage James, 1909–1931
 Rev. Frederick William Hall, 1931–1933
 Sir Cyril Norwood, 1933–1946
 Austin Lane Poole, 1947–1957
 William Costin, 1957–1963
 John David Mabbott, 1963–1969
 Sir Richard W. Southern, 1969–1981
 Sir John Kendrew, 1981–1987
 William Hayes, 1987–2001
 Sir Michael Scholar, 2001–July 2012
 Margaret Snowling, September 2012–2022
 Dame Sue Black, Baroness Black of Strome, September 2022–

See also
 St John's College, Oxford
 Oxford University

References

Presidents
St John's College, Presidents
St John's College, Oxford